Robert Talbot (1916-1941) was a South African flying ace of World War II, credited with 10 'kills'.

Born in Boksburg, he joined the South African Air Force and received his pilot wings in October 1939. He flew Hawker Hartebees with 13 Squadron SAAF in 1940 before being posted to 274 Squadron from September 1940 to January 1941, taking part in the first Libyan Campaign. He was briefly posted home but then joined 1 Squadron SAAF in April 1941, flying Hurricanes. On 3 June 1941 his aircraft was damaged during a strafing run and his Hurricane crashed into the sea on the way back to base and he was killed.

References

South African World War II flying aces
1916 births
1941 deaths
South African military personnel of World War II
South African military personnel killed in World War II
Aviators killed by being shot down